Gökgöl can refer to:

 Gökgöl Cave
 Gökgöl, Çivril